Beijing Guoan Talent Singapore Football Club (北京国安精英队) was a Chinese professional soccer club which was formed to play as a foreign team in Singapore's 2010 S.League.

The club was a satellite team of the Chinese Super League club Beijing Guoan F.C. Players from Beijing Guoan's youth teams made up its S.League squad.

Beijing Guoan (Singapore) became the ninth foreign team to compete in the S-League after Sinchi FC (2003), Albirex Niigata (2004), Sporting Afrique (2006), Liaoning Guangyuan and Super Reds (both 2007), Dalian Shide (2008), DPMM (2009) and Etoile FC (2010).

In 2011, the Football Association of Singapore decided to replace them with Tanjong Pagar United.

Last squad

Seasons

External links
 6 Young Lions and 10 Beijing players charged for S.League brawl
 S.League.Com: Étoile FC and Beijing Guoan to play in S.League 2010
 TODAYonline.com: Beijing Guo'an start with a clean slate, say FAS
 ChannelNewsAsia.Com: Football: French and Chinese team expected to add more buzz to S.League
 早报体育: 中国超级联赛冠军北京国安将角逐新联赛
 早报体育: 取代韩国超红和文莱DPMM 北京国安法国埃图瓦勒角逐新联赛
 法国球队加盟新联赛 国安预备队对抗欧洲力量_中国足球_体育_腾讯网
 2010 S-League season set for kick-off – Beijing Guo’an named as final team for 2010 Great Eastern-Yeo’s S-League season
 Reuters: French and Chinese sides enter Singapore league for 2010
 北京国安足球俱乐部官方网站-国安身影显现新加坡 首场遭遇法国劲旅

Beijing Guoan F.C.
Foreign teams in Singapore football leagues
1992 establishments in Singapore
Singapore Premier League clubs
2011 disestablishments in Singapore
Expatriated football clubs